International style may refer to:

International Style (architecture), the early 20th century modern movement in architecture
International style (art), the International Gothic style in medieval art
International Style (dancing), a term used in ballroom dancing
International Typographic Style, a Switzerland-based graphic design movement
International fashion, clothing styles across the world